Spinifex Press is an independent feminist book publisher based in Australia. It was established in March 1991 by Renate Klein and Susan Hawthorne. It has over 200 titles in print and publishes both fiction and non-fiction that is innovative and controversial. It specialises in subjects of feminist interest including lesbian literature, women's health, writing by indigenous, Asian and African women and books discussing ecology, globalisation, violence against women, prostitution and pornography. Spinifex was one of the earliest Australian publishers to adapt to new technologies by offering a web-based catalogue and enabling on-line purchase of all titles. It has been publishing ebooks since 2006.

Spinifex Press celebrated its 25th anniversary in September 2016 with a two-day conference for radical feminists culminating in the drafting of a radical feminist manifesto. In March 2021 Spinifex celebrated its 30th anniversary on Zoom with an event titled "Welcome to Country", showcasing Indigenous Australian writing.

Authors are Australian and international and include Sheila Jeffreys, Melinda Tankard Reist, Finola Moorhead, Diane Bell, Merlinda Bobis, Beryl Fletcher, Unity Dow, Maria Mies, Rose Zwi,  Fethiye Çetin, Dale Spender, Mary Daly, Janice Raymond, Vandana Shiva and Julie Bindel.

Notes

External links
Official website

Feminist book publishing companies
Book publishing companies of Australia
Publishing companies established in 1991
Small press publishing companies